Alfonso Plummer Torres (born September 4, 1997) is a Puerto Rican professional basketball player for Paris Basketball of the LNB Pro A and the Puerto Rican national team. He played college basketball for the Arizona Western Matadors, the Utah Utes and the Illinois Fighting Illini.

Early life and high school career
Plummer was born in Fajardo, Puerto Rico. He began his basketball career as more of a slasher/scorer, but began to focus on his shooting at age 12 due to advice from his father. Plummer attended Colegio La Luz Juncos in Puerto Rico.

College career
Plummer began his college career at Arizona Western College, averaging 14.9 points per game as a freshman. He helped Arizona Western finish 23–10 and won the NJCAA Region I title. Plummer scored 23 points and had nine rebounds to help win the Region I championship game, 85–81, in overtime against Eastern Arizona College during his sophomore season. As a sophomore he averaged 18.6 points and 3.5 rebounds per game. He was named a NJCAA Division 1 First Team All-American selection. Following his tenure at Arizona Western College, Plummer transferred to Utah. 

On March 11, 2020, he scored a career-high 35 points including 11 three-pointers in a 71–69 loss to Oregon State. Plummer averaged 8.4 points and 1.1 rebounds per game as a junior and shot 42% from the three point line. As a senior, he averaged 13.6 points, 2.2 rebounds and 1 assist per game, shooting 38.3% from the three. He also made the Pac-12 Academic Honor Roll. Following the season Plummer opted to return for his fifth season of eligibility, granted due to the COVID-19 pandemic, and transfer to Illinois. He chose the Illini over offers from BYU, Florida, Georgia and Texas Tech. Plummer was named to the Third Team All-Big Ten.

Professional career

Capitanes de Ciudad de México (2022)
On November 4, 2022, Plummer was named to the opening night roster for the Capitanes de Ciudad de México.

Paris Basketball (2022–present)
On November 17, 2022, he signed with Paris Basketball of the LNB Pro A.

Career statistics

College

NCAA Division I

|-
| style="text-align:left;"| 2019–20
| style="text-align:left;"| Utah
| 26 || 2 || 15.2 || .467 || .420 || .750 || 1.1 || .4 || .4 || .0 || 8.4
|-
| style="text-align:left;"| 2020–21
| style="text-align:left;"| Utah
| 25 || 16 || 28.2 || .441 || .383 || .824 || 2.2 || 1.0 || .7 || .0 || 13.6
|- class="sortbottom"
| style="text-align:center;" colspan="2"| Career
| 51 || 18 || 21.6 || .451 || .399 || .796 || 1.6 || .7 || .6 || .0 || 11.0

JUCO

|-
| style="text-align:left;"| 2017–18
| style="text-align:left;"| Arizona Western
| 33 || 3 || 19.5 || .514 || .458 || .776 || 2.3 || .6 || .6 || .0 || 14.9
|-
| style="text-align:left;"| 2018–19
| style="text-align:left;"| Arizona Western
| 34 || 30 || 29.4 || .482 || .438 || .888 || 3.5 || .7 || .7 || .1 || 18.6
|- class="sortbottom"
| style="text-align:center;" colspan="2"| Career
| 67 || 33 || 24.5 || .495 || .446 || .840 || 2.9 || .7 || .6 || .1 || 16.8

Personal life
Plummer is majoring in international studies. He is the son of Rénan Plummer and Amara Torres, and his father played professional basketball in Panama.

References

External links
Illinois Fighting Illini bio
Utah Utes bio
Arizona Western Matadors bio

1997 births
Living people
21st-century Puerto Rican people
American expatriate basketball people in Greece
American expatriate basketball people in Mexico
Arizona Western Matadors men's basketball players
Capitanes de Ciudad de México players
Illinois Fighting Illini men's basketball players
Lavrio B.C. players
Paris Basketball players
People from Fajardo, Puerto Rico
Puerto Rican men's basketball players
Shooting guards
Utah Utes men's basketball players